1959 may refer to:

The year 1959
1959 (album), by Lee Kernaghan
"1959" (Patti Smith song)
"1959" (John Anderson song)
"1959", a song by The Sisters of Mercy from the album Floodland
"1959", a song by Hamilton Leithauser and Rostam from the album I Had a Dream That You Were Mine
"1959", a song by Saves the Day from Ups & Downs: Early Recordings and B-Sides
1959: The Year Everything Changed, a book by Fred Kaplan